Professor Sir Michael Adrian Richards, CBE, MD, DSc (Hon), FRCP (born 14 July 1951) is a British oncologist. From 1999 to 2013 he was the National Cancer Director in the UK Government's Department of Health. He was appointed to be the Chief Inspector of Hospitals in the Care Quality Commission on 31 May 2013. and was said by the Health Service Journal to be the third most powerful person in the English NHS in December 2013.

Education
Richards attended the Dragon School in Oxford, and Radley College.

Career
Richards is a cancer specialist. He was an Imperial Cancer Research Fund (ICRF) research fellow in medical oncology at St Bartholomew's Hospital in London (1982–86), and then an oncology  consultant at Guy's Hospital in London (1986–95), becoming a Reader in 1991. He was clinical director of Cancer Services at Guy's and St Thomas' Hospital in London (1991–99) and Sainsbury Professor of Palliative Medicine at St Thomas' Hospital from 1995. He was head of the Academic Division of Oncology at King's College London from 1998–99 and chair of the National Cancer Research Institute from 2006–08.

He became a Fellow of the Royal College of Physicians (FRCP) in 1993, Fellow of the Royal College of Radiologists (FRCR) in 2000, and Fellow of the Faculty of Public Health (FFPHM, now FFPH) in 2002.  He has been a trustee of the Science Museum in London and Marie Curie Cancer Care.

When interviewed about inspecting hospitals by The Independent in January 2014 he said "We have seen variation. There is variation between the best hospitals we’ve seen and the ones that are struggling… What is interesting is that within an individual hospital there is variation. The maternity service might be very good but the A&E service might require improvement."

In January 2017 he announced that he intended to retire from his role as Chief Inspector of Hospitals in the summer.

Awards and honours
He received his CBE in 2001 and his knighthood in 2010. In 2014 he received a Cancer Research UK Lifetime Achievement Award.

References

1951 births
Living people
People educated at The Dragon School
People educated at Radley College
20th-century English medical doctors
British oncologists
Cancer researchers
Academics of King's College London
People associated with the Science Museum, London
Fellows of the Royal College of Physicians
Commanders of the Order of the British Empire
Knights Bachelor
21st-century English medical doctors
Administrators in the National Health Service